Rock 'n' Roll Million Sellers is a studio album recorded by American entertainer Connie Francis. It was issued on the Contour label (2870 383) as Connie Francis Sings the Million Sellers.

The album is a tribute to the then-current rock 'n' roll-stars of the era, such as Elvis Presley and Fats Domino. The album's only original recording was "Lipstick on Your Collar", which became a number 5 hit for Francis on the US pop chart in 1959.

Track listing

Side A

Side B

Not included songs from the sessions

References

External links

Connie Francis albums
MGM Records albums
1959 albums
Covers albums
Albums arranged by Ray Ellis
Albums produced by Ray Ellis